Segundo Efraín Santander Cancino (born 7 December 1941), known as Efraín Santander, is a Chilean former professional footballer who played as a goalkeeper for clubs in Chile and Guatemala.

Club career
Santander came to Colo-Colo youth system from La Calera. At senior level, he won two national league titles in 1969 and 1970, becoming one of the few goalkeepers from the youth system who have won any league. In addition, he won the friendly , where competed Dynamo Moscow, Corinthians, among other clubs. In Chile, he also had a brief step on loan at Deportes La Serena in 1961.

In 1972 he moved to Guatemala and joined Municipal.

International career
Since he was 16 years old, he was a Chile youth international footballer. In 1960 he took part of the Chile U20 squad with Hernán Carrasco as coach. At senior level, he made an appearance for the Chile national team in the match against Peru on 21 August 1968.

Personal life
Santander was nicknamed El Negro (The Black One).

Honours
Colo-Colo
 Chilean Primera División (2): 1963, 1970
  (1): 

Municipal
 Liga Nacional de Fútbol de Guatemala (1): 

Chile
  (1):

References

External links
 
 
 Efraín Santander at PartidosdeLaRoja 
 Efraín Santander at PlaymakerStats

1941 births
Living people
People from Los Andes Province, Chile
Chilean footballers
Chilean expatriate footballers
Chile international footballers
Chile youth international footballers
Chile under-20 international footballers
Colo-Colo footballers
Deportes La Serena footballers
C.S.D. Municipal players
Chilean Primera División players
Primera B de Chile players
Salvadoran Primera División players
Liga Nacional de Fútbol de Guatemala players
Chilean expatriate sportspeople in El Salvador
Chilean expatriate sportspeople in Guatemala
Expatriate footballers in El Salvador
Expatriate footballers in Guatemala
Association football goalkeepers